Gustav Robert Kirchhoff (12 March 1824 – 17 October 1887) was a German physicist who contributed to the fundamental understanding of electrical circuits, spectroscopy, and the emission of black-body radiation by heated objects.

He coined the term black-body radiation in 1862. Several different sets of concepts are named "Kirchhoff's laws" after him, concerning such diverse subjects as black-body radiation and spectroscopy, electrical circuits, and thermochemistry. The Bunsen–Kirchhoff Award for spectroscopy is named after him and his colleague, Robert Bunsen.

Life and work 
Gustav Kirchhoff was born on 12 March 1824 in Königsberg, Prussia, the son of Friedrich Kirchhoff, a lawyer, and Johanna Henriette Wittke. His family were Lutherans in the Evangelical Church of Prussia. He graduated from the Albertus University of Königsberg in 1847 where he attended the mathematico-physical seminar directed by Carl Gustav Jacob Jacobi, Franz Ernst Neumann and Friedrich Julius Richelot. In the same year, he moved to Berlin, where he stayed until he received a professorship at Breslau. Later, in 1857, he married Clara Richelot, the daughter of his mathematics professor Richelot. The couple had five children. Clara died in 1869. He married Luise Brömmel in 1872.

 
Kirchhoff formulated his circuit laws, which are now ubiquitous in electrical engineering, in 1845, while still a student. He completed this study as a seminar exercise; it later became his doctoral dissertation. He was called to the University of Heidelberg in 1854, where he collaborated in spectroscopic work with Robert Bunsen. In 1857, he calculated that an electric signal in a resistanceless wire travels along the wire at the speed of light. He proposed his law of thermal radiation in 1859, and gave a proof in 1861. Together Kirchhoff and Bunsen invented the spectroscope, which Kirchhoff used to pioneer the identification of the elements in the Sun, showing in 1859 that the Sun contains sodium. He and Bunsen discovered caesium and rubidium in 1861.
At Heidelberg he ran a mathematico-physical seminar, modelled on Franz Ernst Neumann's, with the mathematician Leo Koenigsberger. Among those who attended this seminar were Arthur Schuster and Sofia Kovalevskaya.

He contributed greatly to the field of spectroscopy by formalizing three laws that describe the spectral composition of light emitted by incandescent objects, building substantially on the discoveries of David Alter and Anders Jonas Ångström. In 1862, he was awarded the Rumford Medal for his researches on the fixed lines of the solar spectrum, and on the inversion of the bright lines in the spectra of artificial light. In 1875 Kirchhoff accepted the first chair dedicated specifically to theoretical physics at Berlin.

He also contributed to optics, carefully solving the wave equation to provide a solid foundation for Huygens' principle (and correct it in the process).

In 1864, he was elected as a member of the American Philosophical Society.

In 1884, he became foreign member of the Royal Netherlands Academy of Arts and Sciences.

Kirchhoff died in 1887, and was buried in the St Matthäus Kirchhof Cemetery in Schöneberg, Berlin (just a few meters from the graves of the Brothers Grimm). Leopold Kronecker is buried in the same cemetery.

Kirchhoff's circuit laws

Kirchhoff's first law is that the algebraic sum of currents in a network of conductors meeting at a point (or node) is zero. The second law is that in a closed circuit, the directed sums of the voltages in the system is zero.

Kirchhoff's three laws of spectroscopy 

A solid, liquid, or dense gas excited to emit light will radiate at all wavelengths and thus produce a continuous spectrum.
A low-density gas excited to emit light will do so at specific wavelengths, and this produces an emission spectrum. 
 If light composing a continuous spectrum passes through a cool, low-density gas, the result will be an absorption spectrum.

Kirchhoff did not know about the existence of energy levels in atoms. The existence of discrete spectral lines was known since Fraunhofer discovered them in 1814. And that the lines formed a discrete mathematical pattern was described by Johann Balmer in 1885. Joseph Larmor explained the splitting of the spectral lines in a magnetic field known as the Zeeman Effect by the oscillation of electrons. But these discrete spectral lines were not explained as electron transitions until the Bohr model of the atom in 1913, which helped lead to quantum mechanics.

Kirchhoff's law of thermal radiation 
It was Kirchhoff's law of thermal radiation in which he proposed an unknown universal law for radiation that led Max Planck to the discovery of the quantum of action leading to quantum mechanics.

Kirchhoff's law of thermochemistry 

Kirchhoff showed in 1858 that, in thermochemistry, the variation of the heat of a chemical reaction is given by the difference in heat capacity between products and reactants:

.

Integration of this equation permits the evaluation of the heat of reaction at one temperature from measurements at another temperature.

Works
 
 
 Vorlesungen über mathematische Physik. 4 vols., B. G. Teubner, Leipzig 1876–1894.
 Vol. 1: Mechanik. 1. Auflage, B. G. Teubner, Leipzig 1876 (online).
 Vol. 2: Mathematische Optik. B. G. Teubner, Leipzig 1891 (Herausgegeben von Kurt Hensel, online).
 Vol. 3: Electricität und Magnetismus. B. G. Teubner, Leipzig 1891 (Herausgegeben von Max Planck, online).
 Vol. 4: Theorie der Wärme. B. G. Teubner, Leipzig 1894, Herausgegeben von Max Planck

See also 
 Kirchhoff equations
 Kirchhoff integral theorem
 Kirchhoff matrix
 Kirchhoff stress tensor
 Kirchhoff transformation
 Kirchhoff's diffraction formula
 Kirchhoff's perfect black bodies
 Kirchhoff's theorem
 Kirchhoff–Helmholtz integral
 Kirchhoff–Love plate theory
 Piola–Kirchhoff stress
 Saint Venant–Kirchhoff model
 Stokes–Kirchhoff attenuation formula
 Circuit rank
 Computational aeroacoustics
 Flame emission spectroscopy
 Spectroscope
 Kirchhoff Institute of Physics
 List of German inventors and discoverers

Notes

References

 HathiTrust full text. Partial English translation available in Magie, William Francis, A Source Book in Physics (1963). Cambridge: Harvard UP. p. 354-360.

Further reading 
 
 
 
 Klaus Hentschel: Gustav Robert Kirchhoff und seine Zusammenarbeit mit Robert Wilhelm Bunsen, in: Karl von Meyenn (Hrsg.) Die Grossen Physiker, Munich: Beck, vol. 1 (1997), pp. 416–430, 475–477, 532–534.
 Klaus Hentschel: Mapping the Spectrum. Techniques of Visual Representation in Research and Teaching, Oxford: OUP, 2002.
 Kirchhoff's 1857 paper on the speed of electrical signals in a wire

External links

Open Library

 
1824 births
1887 deaths
Optical physicists
19th-century German inventors
Discoverers of chemical elements
Scientists from Königsberg
Spectroscopists
Fluid dynamicists
University of Königsberg alumni
Academic staff of the University of Breslau
Academic staff of Heidelberg University
Academic staff of the Humboldt University of Berlin
Honorary Fellows of the Royal Society of Edinburgh
Foreign Members of the Royal Society
Foreign associates of the National Academy of Sciences
Members of the Royal Netherlands Academy of Arts and Sciences
Recipients of the Pour le Mérite (civil class)
19th-century German physicists
Rare earth scientists
Fellows of the Royal Society of Edinburgh
Recipients of the Matteucci Medal
Members of the Göttingen Academy of Sciences and Humanities